Yangmiao is a town in Hanjiang District, Yangzhou, Jiangsu, China. , it administers one residential neighborhood (Yangmiao) and the following eight villages:
Yangmiao Village
Huaping Village
Shuangmiao Village
Youyi Village
Xinyang Village
Yanshanhe Village
Cangjie Village
Zhaozhuang Village

References

Township-level divisions of Jiangsu
Hanjiang District, Yangzhou